The 1984 Chico State Wildcats football team represented California State University, Chico as a member of the Northern California Athletic Conference (NCAC) during the 1984 NCAA Division II football season. Led by first-year head coach Mike Bellotti, Chico State compiled an overall record of 4–5–1 with a mark of 2–3–1 in conference play, placing fourth in the NCAC. The team outscored its opponents 214 to 205 for the season. The Wildcats played home games at University Stadium in Chico, California.

Schedule

References

Chico State
Chico State Wildcats football seasons
Chico State Wildcats football